Brategg Bank is an undersea bank off the Antarctic Peninsula in Antarctica. It was named in July 1964 by the Advisory Committee for Undersea Features.

References
 

Undersea banks of the Southern Ocean